Coleophora ibipennella is a moth of the case-bearer family (Coleophoridae). It was first described by Philipp Christoph Zeller in 1849 and is found in Asia, Europe and North Africa. The larva feed within a pistol case on oak leaves (Quercus species) and in the past was confused with Coleophora betulella, whose larva feed from a similar looking pistol case on birch leaves (Betula species).

Taxonomy
The moth was first described in 1849 by Phillpp Zeller from a specimen found on oak at Frankfurt on Main, Germany. Four years later the species was mentioned by Henry Stainton as a moth to look for in Britain. Shortly afterwards he found a larval pistol case on birch and called it, firstly C. ibipennella Heyden, and later C. ibipennella Zeller. Stainton believed they were the same species (i.e. conspecific) as Zeller’s oak-feeding moth. In 1861 John Scott realised they were separate species and re-named the oak-feeding moth C. ardeaepennella. This left the birch-feeding specimen as C. ibipennella. Maximilian Wocke introduced the name C. betulella, in 1877 for the birch-feeding species. English authors continued to use the name C. ibipennella, but as C. ibipennella Stainton to distinguish it from C. ibipennella Zeller. Following protests by entomologists, Edward Meyrick in 1928 and Kloet and Hincks in 1945, they correctly referred to the birch-feeding species as C. betulella. Unfortunately incorrect British nomenclature continued to be followed by Ian Heslop and Kloet and Hincks in 1961 and 1972 respectively and by subsequent recorders.

Distribution
Owing to the problems of identifying this species and Coleophora betulella, there has been some confusion over the distribution of this species in the past. It is found in Europe from central Scandinavia southwards, as well as in North Africa and in the Near East to Lebanon.

Description
The larvae feed on oaks (Quercus species).

References
  (2010): Markku Savela's Lepidoptera and some other life forms – Coleophora ibipennella. Version of 2010-FEB-01. Retrieved 2010-APR-13.

External links

ibipennella
Moths described in 1849
Moths of Africa
Moths of Europe
Moths of the Middle East
Taxa named by Philipp Christoph Zeller